Acratodes phakellurata is a moth of the family Geometridae first described by Achille Guenée in 1857. It is found on Hispaniola and Jamaica.

References

Moths described in 1857
Sterrhinae
Moths of the Caribbean